Wheelchair basketball at the 1988 Summer Paralympics consisted of men's and women's team events.

At the 1988 Games, Les Autres sportspeople were not eligible to participate in wheelchair basketball.

Medal summary 

Source: Paralympic.org

See also
Basketball at the 1988 Summer Olympics

References 

 

Wheelchair basketball
1988
1988 in basketball
International basketball competitions hosted by South Korea